Phoenix High School is a public high school in Phoenix, Oregon, United States.

Academics
According to U.S. News & World Report, Phoenix High School ranks #20 out of 328 ranked Oregon high schools.  Nationally, it is ranked #2444. There are 766 students enrolled at Phoenix High School and of those enrolled students, 39% are a minority and 56% come from disenfranchised backgrounds.

References

High schools in Jackson County, Oregon
Phoenix, Oregon
Public high schools in Oregon